He Tar Kahich Nay is an Indian television stand-up comedy show in Marathi language originally aired on Zee Marathi. It was hosted by Akshaya Deodhar. Siddhartha Jadhav was also part of the show as Special Guest. It was directed by Nilesh Sable. It was premiered from 10 December 2021 and ended on 5 March 2022 aired with 26 episodes.

Concept 
It is a stand-up comedy show where various celebrities share their day-to-day life experiences on the stage.

Celebrity Guests 
 Ramesh Deo
 Prema Kiran
 Sanjay Mone
 Spruha Joshi
 Shashikant Pedwal
 Sushma Shiromani
 Veena Jagtap

References

External links 
 He Tar Kahich Nay at ZEE5

Zee Marathi original programming
Marathi-language television shows
Indian reality television series
2021 Indian television series debuts
2022 Indian television series endings